Pelleedu Pillalu is a Telugu-language drama film released in 1982 and directed by Bapu. Suresh and Vijayashanti play the leads in this film, with Sangeetha, Sarath Babu, Sumalatha and J. V. Somayajulu in the supporting cast. M. S. Viswanatham scored the music, while the lyrics were written by Sri Sri and Aathreya.

Actor Suresh was introduced to the Telugu screen through this film.

Plot
On her deathbed, the sister of P. V. Rao (J. V. Somayajulu) entrusts to him the custody of her property along with daughters Durga (Sangeetha) and Shanti (Vijayashanti). After her death, he usurps the property and arranges Durga's marriage with a pauper Chalapati (Sarath Babu). After learning of the maternal uncle's intentions, Durga prepares and sells household items along with Shanti for livelihood. Learning that Rao's son (Suresh) is her cousin, Shanti starts teasing him along with her friend Annapoorna (Sumalatha). After learning their relation, he too starts liking Shanti. Upon hearing about Shanti and his son, Rao accuses the sisters of usurping his property through his son. This enrages Durga, who starts an eatery in front of her uncle's hotel and develops it into a hotel to pull down his business. Rao is bedridden with his business going down. Meanwhile, Durga fixes Shanti's wedding with Chandram (Sai Chand), Ananapoorna's love interest. When Shanti learns of this, she informs Rao about her intent to wed his son and requests his help in this matter. Reformed, Rao assures her of this and instructs Shanti to follow her sister. On the wedding day, with help of Chalapati, Annapurna and her mother (Rama Prabha), Rao arranges the wedding of Shanti with his son and that of Annapoorna with Chandram. Durga gets angered  at the turn of events. The story ends on a happy note with everyone present explaining the situation to Durga.

Cast
Suresh as Ramesh
Vijayshanti as Santhi
Sai Chand as Chandram
Sumalatha as Annapoorna "Poorna"
Sangeetha as Durga
Sarath Babu as Chalapati, Durga's husband
J. V. Somayajulu as P. V. Rao
Rama Prabha as Annapoorna's mother
Suryakantam
Potti Prasad

Crew
 Director – Bapu
 Story – Mullapudi Venkata Ramana
 Dialogue – Mullapudi Venkata Ramana
 Producer – D. Madhusudhana Rao
 Production Company – Annapoorna Kalanikethan, Annapoorna Pictures
 Cinematographer – Baba Azmi
 Editor – G. R. Anil Dattatreya
 Choreographer – K. Tangappan

Soundtrack

External links
 
 Pelleedu Pillalu songs on Raaga.com

1980s Telugu-language films
1982 films
Indian drama films
Films directed by Bapu
Films scored by M. S. Viswanathan
1982 drama films